These are the late night schedules on all three networks beginning September 1967. All times are Eastern/Pacific.

NET is not included, as member television stations have local flexibility over most of their schedules and broadcast times for network shows may vary, ABC is not included on the weekend schedules (as the network do not offer late night programs of any kind on weekends).

Talk/Variety shows are highlighted in yellow, Local News & Programs are highlighted in white.

Monday-Friday

Saturday/Sunday

By network

ABC

Returning Series
The Joey Bishop Show

NBC

Returning Series
The Tonight Show Starring Johnny Carson
The Weekend Tonight Show

Not returning from 1966-67
The Saturday/Sunday Tonight Show

U

Not returning from 1966-67
The Las Vegas Show

United States late night network television schedules
1967 in American television
1968 in American television